This is a list of 136 species in Ceratocapsus, a genus of plant bugs in the family Miridae.

Ceratocapsus species

 Ceratocapsus advenus Blatchley, 1926 i c g
 Ceratocapsus alayoi Hernandez and Henry, 1999 c g
 Ceratocapsus alvarengai T. Henry, 1983 c g
 Ceratocapsus amapaensis Carvalho and Fontes, 1983 c g
 Ceratocapsus amazonensis Carvalho and Fontes, 1983 c g
 Ceratocapsus apicalis Knight, 1925 i c g b
 Ceratocapsus apicatus Van Duzee, 1921 i c g b
 Ceratocapsus argentinus Carvalho and Fontes, 1983 c g
 Ceratocapsus aurantiacus Henry, 1978 i c g
 Ceratocapsus avelinae Maldonado, 1986 c g
 Ceratocapsus bahiensis Carvalho and Fontes, 1983 c g
 Ceratocapsus balli Knight, 1927 i c g
 Ceratocapsus barbatus Knight, 1927 i c g b
 Ceratocapsus barberi Knight, 1930 i c g
 Ceratocapsus barensis Carvalho and Fontes, 1985 c g
 Ceratocapsus batistai Carvalho and Fontes, 1985 c g
 Ceratocapsus biformis Knight, 1927 i c g
 Ceratocapsus bifurcus Knight, 1927 i c g
 Ceratocapsus blatchleyi Henry, 1979 i c g
 Ceratocapsus boliviensis T. Henry, 1983 c g
 Ceratocapsus boliviosara Carvalho and Fontes, 1983 c g
 Ceratocapsus brunneus T. Henry, 1983 c g
 Ceratocapsus camelus Knight, 1930 i c g
 Ceratocapsus castaneus Reuter, 1908 c g
 Ceratocapsus catarinensis Carvalho and Fontes, 1983 c g
 Ceratocapsus cecilsmithi Henry, 1979 i c g
 Ceratocapsus clavicornis Knight, 1925 i c g
 Ceratocapsus complicatus Knight, 1927 i c g
 Ceratocapsus consimilis Reuter, 1907 c g
 Ceratocapsus contrastus T. Henry, 1983 c g
 Ceratocapsus corcovadensis Carvalho and Fontes, 1983 c g
 Ceratocapsus cordobensis Carvalho and Fontes, 1983 c g
 Ceratocapsus cubanus Bergroth, 1910 c g
 Ceratocapsus cunealis Henry, 1985 i c g
 Ceratocapsus cuneotinctus T. Henry, 1983 c g
 Ceratocapsus decurvatus Knight, 1930 i c g
 Ceratocapsus denticulatus Knight, 1925 i c g
 Ceratocapsus diamantinensis Carvalho and Fontes, 1983 c g
 Ceratocapsus digitulus Knight, 1923 i c g
 Ceratocapsus dispersus Carvalho and Fontes, 1983 c g
 Ceratocapsus divaricatus Knight, 1927 i c g
 Ceratocapsus downesi Knight, 1927 i c g
 Ceratocapsus drakei Knight, 1923 i c g
 Ceratocapsus egens (Distant, 1893) c g
 Ceratocapsus elongatus (Uhler, 1894) i c g
 Ceratocapsus emboabanus Carvalho and Fontes, 1983 c g
 Ceratocapsus esavianus Carvalho and Ferreira, 1986 c g
 Ceratocapsus fanseriae Knight, 1930 i c g
 Ceratocapsus fasciatus (Uhler, 1877) i c g b
 Ceratocapsus fascipennis Knight, 1930 i c g
 Ceratocapsus fulvipennis Knight, 1927 i c g
 Ceratocapsus fuscinus Knight, 1923 i c g
 Ceratocapsus fuscopunctatus T. Henry, 1983 c g
 Ceratocapsus fuscosignatus Knight, 1927 i c g
 Ceratocapsus fusiformis Van Duzee, 1917 i c g
 Ceratocapsus geminatus Knight, 1930 i c g
 Ceratocapsus grandis T. Henry, 1983 c g
 Ceratocapsus graziae Carvalho and Fontes, 1983 c g
 Ceratocapsus guanabarinus Carvalho and Fontes, 1983 c g
 Ceratocapsus guaraniensis Carvalho and Fontes, 1983 c g
 Ceratocapsus guaratibanus Carvalho and Fontes, 1983 c g
 Ceratocapsus guianensis Carvalho and Fontes, 1983 c g
 Ceratocapsus hirsutus Henry, 1979 i c g
 Ceratocapsus holguinensis Hernandez and Henry, 1999 c g
 Ceratocapsus husseyi Knight, 1930 i c g
 Ceratocapsus incisus Knight, 1923 i c g
 Ceratocapsus insignis (Distant, 1893) c
 Ceratocapsus insperatus Blatchley, 1928 i c g
 Ceratocapsus itaguaiensis Carvalho and Fontes, 1983 c g
 Ceratocapsus juglandis Knight, 1930 i c g
 Ceratocapsus keltoni Henry, 1985 i c g
 Ceratocapsus kerri Carvalho and Fontes, 1985 c g
 Ceratocapsus knighti Henry, 1979 i c g
 Ceratocapsus liliae Carvalho and Ferreira, 1986 c g
 Ceratocapsus lividipes Reuter, 1912 c g
 Ceratocapsus londrinensis Carvalho and Fontes, 1983 c g
 Ceratocapsus lutescens Reuter, 1876 i c g
 Ceratocapsus luteus Knight, 1923 i c g
 Ceratocapsus manaura Carvalho and Fontes, 1985 c g
 Ceratocapsus mariliensis Carvalho and Fontes, 1983 c g
 Ceratocapsus mcateei Knight, 1927 i c g
 Ceratocapsus medius T. Henry, 1983 c g
 Ceratocapsus minensis Carvalho and Fontes, 1983 c g
 Ceratocapsus minutus (Uhler, 1893) i c g
 Ceratocapsus missionensis Carvalho and Carpintero, 1986 c g
 Ceratocapsus modestus (Uhler, 1887) i c g b
 Ceratocapsus neoboroides Knight, 1930 i c g
 Ceratocapsus nevadensis Knight, 1968 i c g
 Ceratocapsus nigellus Knight, 1923 i c g b
 Ceratocapsus nigrocephalus Knight, 1923 i c g b
 Ceratocapsus nigrocuneatus Knight, 1968 i c g
 Ceratocapsus nigropiceus Reuter, 1907 i c g
 Ceratocapsus oculatus Knight, 1930 i c g
 Ceratocapsus paraguayensis Carvalho and Fontes, 1983 c g
 Ceratocapsus parauara Carvalho and Fontes, 1983 c g
 Ceratocapsus peruanus Carvalho, 1985 c g
 Ceratocapsus piceatus Henry, 1979 i c g
 Ceratocapsus pilosulus Knight, 1930 i c g b
 Ceratocapsus pilosus Reuter, 1905 c g
 Ceratocapsus platensis Carvalho and Fontes, 1983 c g
 Ceratocapsus plaumanni Carvalho, 1985 c g
 Ceratocapsus praeustus (Distant, 1893) c g
 Ceratocapsus proximus Blatchley, 1934 i c g
 Ceratocapsus pubescens Henry, 1979 i c g
 Ceratocapsus pumilus (Uhler, 1887) i c g b
 Ceratocapsus punctipes T. Henry, 1983 c g
 Ceratocapsus punctulatus (Reuter, 1876) i
 Ceratocapsus quadrispiculus Knight, 1927 i c g
 Ceratocapsus riodocensis Carvalho and Fontes, 1983 c g
 Ceratocapsus roppai Carvalho and Fontes, 1983 c g
 Ceratocapsus rubricornis Knight, 1927 i c g
 Ceratocapsus rufistigmus Blatchley, 1926 i c g
 Ceratocapsus seabrai Carvalho and Fontes, 1983 c g
 Ceratocapsus sericeicola T. Henry, 1983 c g
 Ceratocapsus sericus Knight, 1923 i c g
 Ceratocapsus seticornis Knight, 1953 i c g
 Ceratocapsus setosus Reuter, 1909 i c g b
 Ceratocapsus sinopensis Carvalho and Fontes, 1983 c g
 Ceratocapsus spinosus Henry, 1978 i c g
 Ceratocapsus stonedahli Hernandez and Henry, 1999 c g
 Ceratocapsus surinanensis Carvalho and Fontes, 1983 c g
 Ceratocapsus taxodii Knight, 1927 i c g
 Ceratocapsus testatipes T. Henry, 1983 c g
 Ceratocapsus teutonianus Carvalho and Fontes, 1983 c g
 Ceratocapsus tricolor Knight, 1927 i c g
 Ceratocapsus truncatus Knight, 1930 i c g
 Ceratocapsus tucuruiensis Carvalho and Fontes, 1983 c g
 Ceratocapsus uniformis Knight, 1927 i c
 Ceratocapsus veraensis Carvalho and Fontes, 1983 c g
 Ceratocapsus vicinus Knight, 1923 i c g
 Ceratocapsus villosus (Distant, 1884) c
 Ceratocapsus vissosensis Carvalho and Ferreira, 1986 c g
 Ceratocapsus vulcanopereirai Carvalho and Fontes, 1983 c g
 Ceratocapsus wheeleri Henry, 1979 i c g
 Ceratocapsus woytkowskii T. Henry, 1983 c g
 Ceratocapsus wygodzinskyi Carvalho and Fontes, 1983 c g

Data sources: i = ITIS, c = Catalogue of Life, g = GBIF, b = Bugguide.net

References

Ceratocapsus
Articles created by Qbugbot